

2015–16 Top 3 standings

Events summary

Standings
For each event, a first place gives 60 points, a 2nd place 54 pts, a 3rd place 48 pts, a 4th place 43 pts, a fifth place 40 pts, a 6th place 38 pts, 7th 36 pts 8th 34 points, 9th 32 points, 10th 31 points, then linearly decreasing by one point down to the 40th place. Equal placings (ties) give an equal number of points. The sum of all WC points of the season, minus the points from  2 events in which the biathlete got the worst scores, gives the biathlete's total WC score.

References

Overall Women